Thomas Cooper Riggs (22 May 1903 – 5 February 1976) was a sailor from Great Britain, who represented his country at the 1924 Summer Olympics in Le Havre, France. Riggs took the silver in the 8 Metre. In the 1928 competition we became 7th.

References

Sources
 

British male sailors (sport)
Sailors at the 1924 Summer Olympics – 8 Metre
Sailors at the 1928 Summer Olympics – 8 Metre
Olympic sailors of Great Britain
1903 births
1976 deaths
Olympic silver medallists for Great Britain
Olympic medalists in sailing
Medalists at the 1924 Summer Olympics